Bashkim Shehu (born 22 June 1955, Tirana) is an Albanian writer who lives in Barcelona, Spain.

Biography
From 1975 to 1980, he studied Liberal Arts at the University of Tirana. Until 1981, he worked as a screenwriter at Kinostudio Shqipëria e Re. At that time his father, Mehmet Shehu, was Albania's Prime Minister and a leading candidate to replace Enver Hoxha. This connection allowed him access to literary works that were banned by the Communist regime. His exposure to those works prompted his decision to become a writer. His first work appeared in 1977 and, until 1981, he worked as a screenwriter at Kinostudio Shqipëria e Re.

That year, Hoxha accused his father of being a foreign agent. The elder Shehu was found dead in December and Bashkim was sentenced to ten years in prison for distributing subversive propaganda. In 1989, his sentence was reduced to eight years, but he was still kept under house arrest after his release from Spaç Prison. His freedom was restored when the Communist government fell in 1991. He returned to his position at the Kinostudio (now "Albfilm") and remained there until 1993, when he went to Hungary to study sociology at the University of Budapest.

Upon returning to Tirana, he became a monitor for the International Helsinki Federation for Human Rights. In 1997, during the Albanian Civil War, he went into self-exile and settled in Barcelona, where he still resides. After ten years of being an advisor to the Centre de Cultura Contemporània de Barcelona, he became a freelance writer. He and his companion, Edlira Hoxholli, also translate English, Spanish and French works into Albanian.

Works
 Rrugëtimi i mbramë i Ago Ymerit (The Last Journey of Ago Ymeri), roman, Buzuku, Tirana, 1995 
 Rrethi (The Circle), roman, Pristina, 2000, Tirana, 2002
 Orfeu në Zululandën e Re (Orpheus in New Zululand), roman, Tirana, 2003
 Udhëkryqi dhe humnerat (The Crossroad and the Abysses ), roman, Tirana, 2003
 Gjarpri dhe heronj të tjerë (The Serpent and Other Heroes), roman, Tirana, 2004
 Angelus Novus (Angelus Novus), roman, Tirana, Toena, 2005 
 Hija e gurit (The Stone's Shadow), récits, Tirana, Toena, 2006 
 Mozart, me vonesë (Mozart with a delay), roman, Tirana, Toena, 2009 
 Loja, shembja e qiellit (The Game, the Fall of the Sky), roman, Tirana, Toena, 2013 
 Fjalor udhëzues për misterin e dosjeve (Guiding Dictionary on the Mystery of the Dossiers), roman, Tirana, Toena, 2015 

 English translations The Last Journey of Ago Ymeri'' (2007)

See also
 Socialist People's Republic of Albania
 Mehmet Shehu
 Enver Hoxha

References

AELC - Escriptors en Llengua Catalana. Bashkim Shehu, an Albanian writer. Molina, Víctor. Revista Literatures Núm. 0 1997 

Centre de Cultura Contemporània de Barcelona – Bashkim Shehu
Book Review: The Last Journey of Ago Ymeri by Bashkim Shehu

Albanian writers
Living people
1955 births
Albanian translators
Translators to Albanian